Operation Hurricane was a 24-hour bombing operation to "demonstrate to the enemy in Germany generally the overwhelming superiority of the Allied Air Forces in this theatre" (in the directive to Harris ACO RAF Bomber Command) and "cause mass panic and  in the Ruhr, disrupt frontline communications and demonstrate the futility of resistance" (in the words of the Official RAF History).

Also during the day, USAAF VIII Bomber Command Mission 677 made PFF attacks on Cologne marshaling yards at Gereon, Gremberg, and Eifelter; as well as  Euskirchen. In some cases RAF crews flew both the daylight and night-time raids; a total of nearly eleven hours flying time in  During the same night the RAF also bombed Brunswick, destroying the town centre.

Notes

References
 Bishop, Patrick (2007). Bomber Boys: Fighting back 1940 — 1945, Harper Press, 2007, 
 McKillop, Jack. U.S. Army Air Forces in World War II:Combat Chronology October 1944,Federal Depository Library Program Electronic Collection of the United States
 Staff 

1944 in Germany
World War II strategic bombing of Germany
Aerial operations and battles of World War II involving the United Kingdom
Aerial operations and battles of World War II involving the United States